Larry Fernandes is an Indian film actor, best known for playing the lead role in the Konkani movie Kazar (2009). He was born in Dubai to Frank Fernandes, Managing Director of Mosaco Shipping company and Alice Fernandes. He currently works for that company. After completing 12th standard in Dubai, he completed his Bachelor of Business Management (BBM) degree course from St. Aloysius College (Mangalore). He will play the lead role in the Kannada movie Ellelloo neene, Nannalloo neene.

References

Living people
Male actors in Konkani cinema
People from Dubai
Indian expatriates in the United Arab Emirates
Male actors in Kannada cinema
Emirati male film actors
Year of birth missing (living people)